The dioceses of Scotland in the High and Later Middle Ages were:

See also
 List of cathedrals in the United Kingdom

 
Scotland in the High Middle Ages
Administrative divisions of Scotland
Scotland in the Late Middle Ages